The 2017 Jinghe earthquake occurred at 07:27 China Standard Time (CST, UTC+8) on 9 August 2017, in Jinghe County, Bortala Mongol Autonomous Prefecture, Xinjiang Uyghur Autonomous Region, China, with magnitude 6.6 and depth 11 kilometres. Most cities in northern Xinjiang felt the quake. This earthquake occurred on the Tian Shan seismic zone. There was no direct relationship to the earthquake in Jiuzhaigou County that occurred the previous day.

Casualties and damage
Until 11:00 CST (UTC+8) on 9 August 2017, this earthquake caused 32 people injured, including 2 critical injuries, and 142 buildings were collapsed and 1060 buildings were damaged. A wall at the Gezhou 110kv Substation in Bajiahu Village fell, but the power supply was still normal.

Aftershocks 

Until 12:00 CST (UTC+8) on 9 August 2017, there occurred 108 aftershocks. Until 15:00 CST (UTC+8) on 10 August 2017, there occurred 18 major aftershocks that reached a magnitude of 3.0, six of which reached a magnitude of 4.0. The major aftershock reported by China Earthquake Networks Center are listed below:

See also 

 List of earthquakes in 2017
 List of earthquakes in China

References

Further reading 
Xu Zhang, Li‐Sheng Xu, Jun Luo, Wanpeng Feng, Hai‐Lin Du, Lu Li, Lei Yi, Chen Zheng, Chun‐Lai Li; Source Characteristics of the 2017 Ms 6.6 (⁠Mw 6.3) Jinghe Earthquake in the Northeastern Tien Shan. Seismological Research Letters doi: https://doi.org/10.1785/0220190194

External links 

2017 earthquakes
2017 disasters in China
August 2017 events in China
Earthquakes in Xinjiang